This list includes both English-language films that were based on previously released foreign-language films and those that were not based on any previous film, but merely share a common source material.

Chinese

Czech

Danish

Dutch

Filipino

French

German

Hebrew

Hindi

Hungarian

Icelandic

Italian

Japanese

Korean

Norwegian

Polish

Portuguese

Russian

Spanish

Swedish

Telugu

Thai

See also
 Lists of film remakes
 List of film remakes (A–M)
 List of film remakes (N–Z)

References

Lists of film remakes